Kappa Phi is a national Christian sisterhood, which "focuses on four areas: Service, Worship, Fellowship, and Study." The student organization is interdenominational Christian, although it was formed under the auspices of the United Methodist Church.

History
Kappa Phi was founded in 1916 by Mrs. Gordon B. Thompson, the former Harriet Sterling, who was married to the student minister at the University of Kansas. The society had experienced growth through schools where there was an existing Wesley Foundation. There were 25 chapters in such universities by 1938 and by 1967, Kappa Phi had a presence in over 33 colleges and universities. Today, it has over 50 active and alumnae chapters.

Chapters

See also

Beta Upsilon Chi
Campus Crusade for Christ
Christian sorority (fraternities and sororities)
Sigma Phi Lambda
Wesley Foundation
International Association of Methodist-related Schools, Colleges, and Universities

References

External links
 

1916 establishments in New York (state)
Evangelical parachurch organizations
International student religious organizations
United Methodist Church
Christian organizations established in 1916
Student organizations established in 1916
Christian fraternities and sororities in the United States
1916 establishments in Kansas